Hedin is a Swedish surname that may refer to:
 
Adolf Hedin (1834–1905), Swedish liberal politician
Pierre Hedin (born 1978), Swedish ice hockey player
Robert Hedin (born 1966), Swedish handball coach and retired player
Roza Güclü Hedin (born 1982), Swedish politician
Sven Hedin (1862–1952), Swedish geographer and explorer
Sven Fredrik Hedin (1923–2004), Swedish diplomat
Tony Hedin (born 1969), Swedish handball coach and retired player, brother of Robert
Tore Hedin (1927–1952), Swedish police officer and murderer
Nana Hedin (born 1968), Swedish singer
Ulrika Hedin (born 1952), Swedish Olympic equestrian
Zelma Hedin (1827–1874), Swedish actress
Clint Hedin (born 1978), American entrepreneur

See also
Heðin

Swedish-language surnames